North Carolina's 27th House district is one of 120 districts in the North Carolina House of Representatives. It has been represented by Democrat Michael Wray since 2005.

Geography
Since 2023, the district has included all of Warren, Halifax and Northampton counties. The district overlaps with the 3rd Senate district.

District officeholders since 1993

Election results

2022

2020

2018

2016

2014

2012

2010

2008

2006

2004

2002

2000

References

North Carolina House districts
Warren County, North Carolina
Halifax County, North Carolina
Northampton County, North Carolina